In rhetoric, antimetabole is the repetition of words in successive clauses, but in transposed order; for example, "I know what I like, and I like what I know". It is related to, and sometimes considered a special case of, chiasmus.

An antimetabole can be predictive, because it is easy to reverse the terms. It may trigger deeper reflection than merely stating one half of the line.

Examples
 "Unus pro omnibus, omnes pro uno" ("One for all, all for one")
 "Eat to live, not live to eat." —attributed to Socrates
"Ask not what your country can do for you; ask what you can do for your country." —John F. Kennedy, "Inaugural Address", January 20, 1961.
 "There is no 'way to peace'. Peace is the way." —Mahatma Gandhi
 "The Sabbath was made for man, not man for the Sabbath." —Mark 2:27
"When the going gets tough, the tough get going.”
 "With my mind on my money and my money on my mind." —Snoop Dogg in the song "Gin and Juice"
 "In America, you can always find a party. In Soviet Russia, Party always finds you!" —Yakov Smirnoff
 "The great object of [Hamlet's] life is defeated by continually resolving to do, yet doing nothing but resolve." —Samuel Taylor Coleridge on William Shakespeare's Hamlet
 "We didn't land on Plymouth Rock. The rock was landed on us." —Malcolm X
 "He was just the man for such a place, and it was just the place for such a man." —Frederick Douglass, Narrative of the Life of Frederick Douglass
 "Fair is foul, and foul is fair" —William Shakespeare, Macbeth
 "And we'll lead, not merely by the example of our power, but by the power of our example." —Joseph R. Biden, "Inaugural Address"
 "All crime is vulgar, just as all vulgarity is crime" —Oscar Wilde, The Picture of Dorian Gray
 "I'm hoping that somebody pray for me, I'm praying that somebody hope for me." —JID in the song "Enemy (Imagine Dragons and JID song)"
 "I pay my bills, and my bills are paid." - Amy Slaton-Halterman in an episode of 1000-lb Sisters

Etymology

See also
Anadiplosis
Chiasmus
Figure of speech
In Soviet Russia
Rhetoric
Symploce

References

Corbett, Edward P.J. Classical Rhetoric for the Modern Student. Oxford University Press, New York, 1971.

External links

Audio examples of antimetabole at americanrhetoric.com

Antimetabole detector at lingfil.uu.se

Rhetoric